Economic history of the Republic of China is covered in the following articles:
Economic history of China (1912–49), the economic history of the Republic of China during the period when it controlled Chinese mainland from 1912 to 1949.
Economic history of Taiwan#Modern history, the economic history of the Republic of China during the period when it only controls Taiwan area after 1949.

See also
 Sino-German cooperation (1926–1941)
 German–Japanese industrial co-operation before World War II
Economy of Taiwan
Economic history of Taiwan
Economic history of China

Economic history of China
Economy of Taiwan